"The Dream" is a song performed by Croatian singer Roko Blažević and written by Jacques Houdek, Andrea Čubrić and Charlie Mason. The song represented Croatia in the Eurovision Song Contest 2019 in Tel Aviv, Israel. A Croatian language version of the song, titled "Heroj" (English: Hero), was released on 18 February 2019. The song was performed during the second semi-final on 16 May 2019, but did not quality for the final.

Background

Prior to the opening of the submission period Jacques Houdek started teasing the song. On 20 November 2018, the Croatian national broadcaster HRT opened the song submission period for composers to send their entries for Dora 2019 until 15 January 2019. On 11 January, Houdek revealed in an interview with Slobodna Dalmacija that Roko Blažević would perform the song "The Dream". Houdek and Blažević previously collaborated in the second season of the singing competition Zvijezde where Blažević finished as runner-up.  "The Dream" was released for digital download as a single through Croatia Records on 17 February 2019. It was written by Jacques Houdek, Andrea Čubrić and Charlie Mason, while music was composed by Houdek.

Eurovision Song Contest

On 17 January 2019, Roko Blažević was confirmed as one of the 16 participants in Dora 2019 with the song "The Dream". On 6 February 2019, the running order was revealed by HRT and Blažević was assigned to the eleventh slot. He won the national final on 16 February with a combined total of 24 points and represented Croatia in the Eurovision Song Contest 2019 in Tel Aviv, Israel. The song was performed during the second semi-final on 16 May 2019, but did not quality for the final.

Commercial performance
"The Dream" debuted at number one on the Croatian HR Top 40 chart, marking Blažević's first appearance on the chart.

Music video
The music video was released on 11 April 2019 via Eurovision Song Contest's YouTube channel.

Track listing

Charts

Release history

References

Eurovision songs of Croatia
Eurovision songs of 2019
2019 songs
2019 singles
Songs with lyrics by Charlie Mason (lyricist)